Adam Brown (born 9 June 1995) is a Scottish footballer who plays for Stenhousemuir as a midfielder. He has also played for Airdrieonians and St Mirren.

Career
Born in Falkirk, Brown started his career in Celtic's youth system before joining St Mirren in 2012. Brown signed a one-year professional contract with St Mirren in May 2014. Brown made his debut for St Mirren starting in a 2–0 home loss against Hamilton Academical in the Scottish Premiership. Brown departed Saints in the summer of 2015, when his contract expired. He left having played seven matches, scoring no goals.

On 25 August 2015, Brown signed for Scottish League One club Airdrieonians.

On 4 June 2018, Brown signed for newly promoted Scottish Championship club Alloa Athletic.

Career statistics

References

External links

1995 births
Living people
Scottish footballers
St Mirren F.C. players
Airdrieonians F.C. players
Association football midfielders
Footballers from Falkirk
Scottish Professional Football League players
Celtic F.C. players
Alloa Athletic F.C. players
Stenhousemuir F.C. players